Basirepomys is an extinct genus of Cricetidae that existed in the United States during the Late Miocene period. It contains the species B. pliocenicus and B. robertsi.

References

Cricetidae
Miocene rodents
Fossil taxa described in 2010
Extinct animals of the United States